Denys Ruslanovych Kostyshyn (born 31 August 1997) is a Ukrainian professional footballer who plays as a striker.

Career
Kostyshyn is a product of the Dynamo Kyiv academy, but in August 2014 he moved to Dnipro.

He made his debut for Dnipro against FC Volyn Lutsk on 30 April 2017 in the Ukrainian Premier League.

On 5 December 2022, it was announced that Kostyshyn would join US second-tier side El Paso Locomotive for their 2023 season.

Personal life
Kostyshyn is a son of Ukrainian retired footballer Ruslan Kostyshyn. His younger brother, Danylo, is also a footballer. Kostyshyn is in a relationship with Yelyzaveta Vasylenko, a Ukrainian actress.

References

External links
 Profile at UAF website
 

1997 births
Sportspeople from Khmelnytskyi, Ukraine
Living people
Ukrainian footballers
Ukrainian Premier League players
Ukrainian First League players
Ukrainian Second League players
FC Dnipro players
FC Kolos Kovalivka players
FC Oleksandriya players
El Paso Locomotive FC players
Association football forwards
Competitors at the 2019 Summer Universiade
Ukraine youth international footballers
Ukraine student international footballers
Ukrainian expatriate footballers
Ukrainian expatriate sportspeople in the United States
Expatriate soccer players in the United States